Studio Santa Claus Entertainment (Korean: 스튜디오 산타클로스엔터테인먼트), formerly Sim Entertainment  (Korean:심엔터테인먼트) and Huayi Brothers Korea (Korean: 화이브라더스 코리아), is a South Korean talent management agency and television production company.

History
At the 4th APAN Star Awards, the agency's founder and former CEO Sim Jung-woon won the award for Best Manager. In March 2016, 26% of the company was bought by Huayi Brothers Media.

In July 2020, the company renamed as Fleet Entertainment and then changed again into Studio Santa Claus Entertainment in August 2020 and the company became independent.

Artists

Current

 Chae Seo-jin (2017-present)
 Choi Tae-joon (2017-present)
 Cha Hyun-Seung (2021-present)
 Ha Yeon-joo
 Ji Yoon-ho (2016-present)
 Joo Jin-mo
 Joo Jin-mo (2016-present)
 Joo Won
 Kang Byul
 Kim Hye-ok
 Kim Ok-bin (2017-present)
 Kim Sung-oh (2017-present)
 Kim Yoon-seok
 Lee Da-hee (2016-present)
 Lee Seon-ho
 Lee Su-woong (2018-present)
 Min Jin-woong
 Oh Hyun-kyung
 Park Bo-ram (2018-present)
 Park Hye-soo
 Park Joo-mi (2019-present)
 Park Se-wan
 Song Sae-byeok (2018-present)
 Soo Ae (2019-present)
 Uhm Tae-woong (2005-2015, 2018-present)

Former
 Choi Kwon
 Gil Hae-yeon
 Go Joo-won (2017-2019)
 Han Sun-hwa (2016 - 2020)
 Hwang Woo-seul-hye
 Jeon Mi-seon
 Jeon Soo-jin (2017-2019)
 Jung Da-bin
 Kang Ji-hwan (2015-2017, 2019)
 Kim Ju-hyeon
 Kim Min-jae
 Kim Sang-ho
 Kang Shin-il
 Kim Jung-eun
 Lee Dong-hwi (2014-2020)
 Lee Yeong-hoon
 Lee Joo-hyung
 Lee Si-young (2016-2020)
 Lim Ji-yeon (2014-2020)
 Lim Yoon-ho
 Park Eun-ji
 Seo Young-hee (2017-2022)
 Uhm Jung-hwa (2005-2015)
 Yoo Hae-jin
 Yoo Gun

Productions

Film
 Steal My Heart (2013, in partnership with So-net Entertainment)
 Another Child (2019, in partnership with Redpeter Films)

Television
 Mask (2015, SBS, in partnership with Golden Thumb)
 Webtoon Hero Toondra Show (2015, MBC every1, in partnership with MBC Plus Media and YLAB)
 Lucky Romance (2016, MBC)
 My Sassy Girl (2017, SBS, in partnership with RaemongRaein and ShinCine Communication)
 The Emperor: Owner of the Mask (2017, MBC, in partnership with People Story Company)
 20th Century Boy and Girl (2017, MBC)
 Joseon Survival Period (2019, TV Chosun, in partnership with Lotte Cultureworks and HIGROUND)
 The Great Show (2019, tvN, in partnership with Lotte Cultureworks and Studio Dragon)
 My Name (2021, Netflix original)
 Rest in Peace (TBA, in partnership with Studio N)

References

External links
 

Talent agencies of South Korea
Television production companies of South Korea
Mass media companies established in 2004
2004 establishments in South Korea